John Button (died 1665) of Buckland, near Lymington, Hampshire was an English politician who sat in the House of Commons  at various times between 1625 and 1648. He fought on the Parliamentary side in the English Civil War.

Button was the son of John Button of Upavon, Wiltshire. He succeeded his father in 1601, and inherited Buckland, Hampshire from his uncle Henry in 1624. He was appointed High Sheriff of Hampshire for 1636.

In 1625, he was elected Member of Parliament for Lymington. He was elected MP for Lymington again in November 1640 for the Long Parliament. Button fought in the parliamentary army and held local offices and that of Captain of Hurst Castle from 1643–45. He was secluded in 1648 under Pride's Purge.

Button married as his first wife Eleanor South, daughter of Thomas South of South Baddesley. Their son John was later MP for Lymington.

References

Year of birth missing
1665 deaths
Roundheads
People from Lymington
English MPs 1625
English MPs 1640–1648
High Sheriffs of Hampshire
Members of the Parliament of England (pre-1707) for Lymington